Bojan Neziri (Serbian Cyrillic: Бојан Незири, born 26 February 1982) is a Serbian football defender who last played for FK Inđija in the Serbian SuperLiga.

Career
Before, he played for FC Metalurh Donetsk since 2003, but was loaned to German team VfL Wolfsburg for one year in 2005. He started his career playing for FK Šabac but was forced to leave for neighbors FK Radnički Zorka after his first club went bankrupt. This is where he got his first senior appearance as a very talented 16-year-old. It wasn't long before he signed for the biggest club in the area, FK Mačva Šabac and then for FK Vojvodina one of the biggest clubs in Serbia. This is where he proved himself as one of the most talented young players in the country and established  his place in the Under-21 Serbia & Montenegro squad.

He was part of the Serbian and Montenegrin 2004 Olympic football team, who exited in the first round, finishing fourth in Group C behind gold-medal winners Argentina, Australia and Tunisia. He earned three senior caps for Serbia and Montenegro.

References

External links
 Bojan Neziri at Srbijafudbal 
 Bojan Neziri Stats at Utakmica.rs 
 

1982 births
Living people
Sportspeople from Šabac
Serbian footballers
Serbian expatriate footballers
Olympic footballers of Serbia and Montenegro
Footballers at the 2004 Summer Olympics
Serbia and Montenegro international footballers
Serbia and Montenegro under-21 international footballers
FK Mačva Šabac players
FK Vojvodina players
VfL Wolfsburg players
FC Metalurh Donetsk players
FC Shakhtar Donetsk players
FC Shakhtar-2 Donetsk players
R.W.D.M. Brussels F.C. players
Győri ETO FC players
FK Inđija players
Ukrainian Premier League players
Ukrainian First League players
Bundesliga players
Expatriate footballers in Hungary
Expatriate footballers in Ukraine
Expatriate footballers in Germany
Expatriate footballers in Belgium
Serbia and Montenegro expatriate footballers
Serbia and Montenegro footballers
Serbia and Montenegro expatriate sportspeople in Ukraine
Serbian expatriate sportspeople in Ukraine
Serbia and Montenegro expatriate sportspeople in Germany
Serbian expatriate sportspeople in Belgium
Serbian expatriate sportspeople in Hungary
Gorani people
Association football defenders